"Dirty Old Egg-Sucking Dog" is a song written by Jack Clement and originally recorded by Johnny Cash on Columbia Records for his novelty album Everybody Loves a Nut released in 1966. The song was notably performed by Cash at Folsom Prison on January 13, 1968, and appears on his live album At Folsom Prison released later that year.

Composition 

According to the book The Best of Country Music, it is one of "the two most intentionally silly songs Jack Clement ever wrote", the other being "Flushed from the Bathroom of Your Heart."

Covers 
Agnostic Front recorded a cover of the song, with altered lyrics, on their 1998 album Something's Gotta Give.

References 

Songs about dogs
Johnny Cash songs
Songs written by Jack Clement
1966 songs
American country music songs
Novelty songs